Greatist is a fitness, health, and happiness Internet media startup founded in 2011 by Derek Flanzraich. It is aimed primarily at an 18-35 year old audience and has a "painstaking focus on quality." Greatist has raised over $8 million from prominent investors such as Ann Miura-Ko from Floodgate Fund and Gary Vaynerchuk.<

References

External links

Internet properties established in 2011
American health websites
Red Ventures